Maria Selena Nurcahya (born September 24, 1990), known as Maria Selena, is an Indonesian actress and beauty pageant titleholder who was crowned Puteri Indonesia 2011 and was represented her country in Miss Universe 2012 pageant. She  represented Central Java in the Pemilihan Puteri Indonesia 2011.

Early career

After the reign she decided to join Indonesian Basketball League as she grew up as a basketball player. Maria Selena made a debut in WNBL Indonesia with Surabaya Fever, then she signed with Merah Putih Predators Jakarta on her second season. She graduated and has a degree majoring Business in Bandung Institute of Technology. Recently, Maria Selena is working with Persatuan Bola Basket Indonesia and INASGOC for 2018 Asian Games. She is well known as an actress and TV presenter.

Pageantry

Puteri Indonesia 2011
Selena, who stands , competed as the representative of Central Java. Selena and the other 37 contestants from 33 provinces competed for the title. She is the second woman from Central Java to win the Puteri Indonesia title. The first one was Agni Pratistha in 2006.

Miss Universe 2012
As the winner of Puteri Indonesia 2011, Selena represented Indonesia in Miss Universe 2012.

Filmography

Movies

TV Films

See also

 Puteri Indonesia 2011
 Miss Universe 2012
 Fiorenza Liza Elly Purnamasari
 Andi Tenri Gusti Hanum Utari Natassa

References

External links
 
 
 
 Official Puteri Indonesia Official Website
 Official Miss Universe Official Website

Living people
1990 births
Indonesian beauty pageant winners
Javanese people
Indonesian Christians
Puteri Indonesia winners
Miss Universe 2012 contestants
People from Palembang
People from Indramayu
Indonesian women's basketball players
Indonesian television presenters
Indonesian women television presenters